The Crossing Guard is a 1995 American independent drama film co-produced, written, and directed by Sean Penn. The film stars Jack Nicholson, David Morse, Robin Wright and Anjelica Huston. It tells the story of Freddy Gale, a man who has been tormented for more than five years by his daughter's death in a car accident. When he finds out that the man who was responsible for the death is being released from prison, he decides to seek vengeance.
 
The film was released on November 16, 1995 and received generally positive reviews from critics.

This was the last film scored by Jack Nitzsche.

Plot 
Jewelry store proprietor Freddy Gale has been tormented for the five years following the death of his daughter Emily. Once a devoted husband and father, he is now an alcoholic who spends his nights hanging out in strip clubs and sleeping with prostitutes. Now the drunk driver who killed her, John Booth, is released from prison. Freddy immediately reveals to his ex-wife Mary that he is going to kill Booth. She begs him not to, and they get into an altercation that ends with her new husband throwing him out of the house.

John Booth is now living in a trailer outside of his parents' house and merely plans to go on with his life, even as he is haunted by remorse for killing Emily. At night Freddy arrives at the Booth residence, armed with a pistol. He clumsily breaks into the trailer trying to shoot, but he forgot to load a magazine. John calmly tells him he won't call the police and will let Freddy kill him, but asks for some time to savor his freedom. Freddy accepts, and gives John three days to live.

John tries to live his life as best as he can before the third day arrives. He meets an artist named JoJo at a friend's party and he has a brief romance with her before she realizes that he can't let go of the mistake he made. He reveals to her that when he hit Emily, he came to her side as she was dying and she apologized to him for "not having looked both ways." John goes to Emily's grave and leaves flowers, but leaves when he sees Mary there.

On the third day, Freddy calls Mary and breaks down in tears as he tells her of a terrible nightmare he had. In the nightmare, he is driving by his daughter's school and stops at a crosswalk where children (including a living Emily) wait. He sees that John Booth is the crossing guard. Freddy then sees himself run over all of the children, even Emily. They meet at a diner, and Mary tells him that he is beyond her help; Freddy becomes enraged and curses her. After Mary leaves, Freddy gets drunk and starts to drive to John's house. John waits in his trailer. Freddy is pulled over by the police en route to the house and arrested for drunk driving. Before the police can take him in, however, Freddy grabs his pistol and runs away. He breaks into a home and hides in a little girl's room. The girl guides the police away, and Freddy thanks her and leaves.

Freddy arrives at John's trailer and waits before he enters. John abruptly jumps from a corner with a rifle in hand. Freddy tells him since he is on the run, on his property, and armed, John should be able to get away with killing him. There is a standoff as they point guns at each other. John however drops his rifle and runs away; Freddy follows him. After a lengthy chase across the city, Freddy catches John climbing a fence and fires at him. John is only superficially wounded, however, and continues running. Freddy follows him, until he realizes that John has led him to the graveyard where Emily is buried. John talks silently to the grave and finally says "Your daddy's coming". Freddy hands John his pistol and cries over the grave, apologizing to his daughter. John takes Freddy's hand as the sun rises.

Cast 

 Jack Nicholson as Freddy Gale
 David Morse as John Booth
 Anjelica Huston as Mary
 Robin Wright Penn as Jojo
 Piper Laurie as Helen Booth
 Richard Bradford as Stuart Booth
 Priscilla Barnes as Verna
 David Baerwald as Peter
 Robbie Robertson as Roger
 John Savage as Bobby
 Kellita Smith as Tanya
 Kari Wuhrer as Mia
 Richard Sarafian as Sunny Ventura
 Joe Viterelli as Joe
 Eileen Ryan as disgruntled store customer

Reception

Critical reception 
The film received generally positive reviews with the review tallying website Rotten Tomatoes reporting a score of 75% based on 28 reviews.

Box office
Despite the positive critical reception, the film grossed only $868,979 in the United States and Canada. It grossed $7 million worldwide, against a budget of $9 million.

Awards 
Anjelica Huston's performance in the film was praised and she received nominations for Best Supporting Actress from the Hollywood Foreign Press and the Screen Actors Guild (SAG). She lost out on the Golden Globe to Mira Sorvino for Mighty Aphrodite and the SAG award to Kate Winslet for Sense and Sensibility.

References

External links 
 
 
 
 

1995 films
1990s thriller films
American crime drama films
American independent films
1995 independent films
Films scored by Jack Nitzsche
Films directed by Sean Penn
Films set in Los Angeles
American films about revenge
Films about grieving
Films about atonement
Miramax films
1990s English-language films
1990s American films